Kota is a TransJakarta BRT Station located at the Old City of Batavia (Kota Tua Jakarta) in Pinangsia, Taman Sari, West Jakarta, Jakarta, Indonesia. The station, which is the terminus of Corridor 1, is the transit point for Corridor 12. The name of this bus stop comes from the name Kota Tua Jakarta and Jakarta Kota railway station, which are located adjacent to the BRT Station. 

Regarding with the revitalization of the Jakarta Kota station yard, this BRT Station was rebuilt in a new location which is to the north of Jakarta Kota Station. The move to the new location was carried out on July 22, 2022, so that the original location which was located on the west of Jakarta Kota Station did not serve passengers anymore. This arrangement was carried out in the framework of integrating this bus stop with the Kota MRT station which is being built.

Supporting Transportation

TransJakarta Non-BRT bus services

Train lines

Places nearby 

 Jakarta Kota railway station
 Jakarta History Museum
 Bank Indonesia Museum
 Bank Mandiri Museum

Gallery

References

External links  

TransJakarta
Bus stations in Indonesia
West Jakarta